Bertram Dalley Tallamy (December 1, 1901 – September 14, 1989) was superintendent of the New York State Department of Public Works from 1948 to 1955. On October 12, 1956, he was named by Dwight D. Eisenhower as the Federal Highway Administrator under the Federal Aid Highway Act of 1956.

Biography 
He was born in Plainfield, New Jersey on December 1, 1901.  He attended the Rensselaer Polytechnic Institute and graduated with a degree in civil engineering in 1925.

He was the superintendent of the New York State Department of Public Works from 1948 to 1955  where he worked alongside Edward Burton Hughes who held the post of Deputy Superintendent.

On October 12, 1956, he was named by Dwight D. Eisenhower as the Federal Highway Administrator. He was sworn in on February 5, 1957. He served as Federal Highway Administrator through the rest of the Eisenhower Administration.

He then founded Bertram D. Tallamy & Associates.

He died on September 14, 1989 at Georgetown University Hospital in Washington, DC of kidney failure.

References 

New York State Superintendents of Public Works
Politicians from Plainfield, New Jersey
1901 births
1989 deaths
Deaths from kidney failure
Administrators of the Federal Highway Administration
American civil engineers
Rensselaer Polytechnic Institute alumni
20th-century American politicians
Eisenhower administration personnel